Waldemir Marques de Brito or simply Waldemir or Neno, is a Brazilian football striker.

Waldemir previously played for URT in the Copa do Brasil.

He joined Hunan Billows in February 2010.

References

Living people
Brazilian footballers
Expatriate footballers in China
1981 births
Hunan Billows players
China League One players
Brazilian expatriate sportspeople in China
União Recreativa dos Trabalhadores players
Esporte Clube Novo Hamburgo players
Association football defenders